Michelle Hastick (born September 16, 1973) is a Canadian athletics competitor. In 2001, she competed in the women's triple jump event at the 2001 World Championships in Athletics held in Edmonton, Canada. She did not qualify to compete in the final.

In 1998, she finished in 6th place in the women's triple jump at the 1998 Commonwealth Games held in Kuala Lumpur, Malaysia. She also competed in the women's long jump event.

References

External links 
 
 
 Michelle Cowell (Hastick) (2015) - Hall of Fame - York University Athletics

Living people
1973 births
Place of birth missing (living people)
Canadian female triple jumpers
Canadian female long jumpers
World Athletics Championships athletes for Canada
Athletes (track and field) at the 1998 Commonwealth Games
Commonwealth Games competitors for Canada
20th-century Canadian women
21st-century Canadian women